Mogi das Cruzes is a train station on CPTM Line 11-Coral, located in the district of Mogi das Cruzes.

History

Mogi das Cruzes station was built and opened by North Railway on 6 November 1875.

Due to the growing of the city of Mogi das Cruzes, EFCB built a new building, opened on 16 September 1929, as the place was a terminus for commuter trains of the "Central".

In the 1950s, it was expanded again, being reopened on 15 March 1958. The current station was built by RFFSA on 20 August 1984. Since 1994, it is operated by CPTM.

References

Companhia Paulista de Trens Metropolitanos stations
Railway stations opened in 1875
Railway stations in Mogi das Cruzes